Benoni Stinson Fuller (November 13, 1825 – April 14, 1903) was an American educator and politician who served two terms as a U.S. Representative from Indiana from 1875 to 1879.

Biography 
Born near Boonville, Indiana, Fuller attended the common schools, and later taught school in Warrick County.  He became sheriff of Warrick County in 1856 and 1858.
He served in the Indiana Senate in 1862, 1870, and 1872, and served as member of the Indiana House of Representatives 1866-1868.

Congress 
Fuller was elected as a Democrat to the Forty-fourth and Forty-fifth Congresses (March 4, 1875 – March 3, 1879).
He was not a candidate for renomination in 1878.

Later career and death 
He then engaged in agricultural pursuits in Warrick County.  He died in Boonville, Indiana, April 14, 1903.  He was interred in Old Boonville Cemetery.

References

1825 births
1903 deaths
Democratic Party Indiana state senators
Democratic Party members of the Indiana House of Representatives
People from Warrick County, Indiana
Democratic Party members of the United States House of Representatives from Indiana
People from Boonville, Indiana
19th-century American politicians